Jamaica competed in the 2019 Pan American Games in Lima, Peru from July 26 to August 11, 2019.

The Jamaica Olympic Association's goal was to the send the most athletes, compete in the most sports and win the most medals at any one appearance by the country. The Jamaican team consisted of 124 athletes (69 men and 55 women) competing in 17 sports.

During the opening ceremony of the games, squash player Christopher Binnie carried the flag of the country as part of the parade of nations.

Jamaica finished the games with a record 19 medals won, surpassing the previous high of 14 won in 1959.

Competitors
The following is the list of number of competitors (per gender) participating at the games per sport/discipline.

Medalists
The following competitors from Jamaica won medals at the games. In the by discipline sections below, medalists' names are bolded.

|  style="text-align:left; vertical-align:top;"|

|  style="text-align:left; width:22%; vertical-align:top;"|

Athletics (track and field)

Jamaica qualified 50 athletes in track and field (22 men and 28 women). The team was officially named on June 28, 2019, and originally consisted of 60 athletes.

Key
Note–Ranks given for track events are for the entire round
Q = Qualified for the next round
q = Qualified for the next round as a fastest loser or, in field events, by position without achieving the qualifying target
GR = Games record
NR = National record
PB = Personal best
SB = Seasonal best
DNS = Did not start

Men
Track events

Athletes in italics did not compete

Field events

Women
Track events

Athletes in italics did not compete and did not receive a medal.

Field events

Badminton

Jamaica qualified a team of four badminton athletes (two per gender).

Singles

Doubles

Bodybuilding

Jamaica qualified one female bodybuilder.

Women

No results were provided for the prejudging round, with only the top six advancing.

Boxing

Jamaica qualified two male boxers.

Men

Canoeing

Sprint
Jamaica received one wild card in canoe sprint.

Men

Position is within the heat

Cycling

Jamaica qualified one woman cyclist.

Track
Women
Keirin

Sprint

Diving

Jamaica qualified one male diver. Yona Knight-Wisdom's silver medal performance in the one metre springboard clinched Jamaica's first ever Pan American Games medal in the sport.

Men

Football

Jamaica qualified a men's and women's team (of 18 athletes each, for a total of 36).

Men's tournament

Roster
The 18-man squad was announced on 21 July 2019. On 23 July defender Alwayne Harvey was replaced by Andre Leslie.

Group B

Fifth place match

Women's tournament

Roster
The following 18 players were named to the roster for the 2019 Pan American Games. Konya Plummer was injured and replaced by Trudi Carter. Carter was then replaced by Lauren Silver due to injury.

Group A

Seventh place match

Gymnastics

Artistic
Jamaica qualified a team of five artistic gymnasts (two men and three women). This will mark Jamaica's debut in the sport at the Pan American Games.

Men

Women
Team & Individual Qualification

Individual finals

Judo

Jamaica qualified one female judoka.

Women

Rugby sevens

Jamaica qualified a men's team of 12 athletes, by winning the 2018 RAN Sevens. This will mark the country's debut in the sport at the Pan American Games.

Men's tournament

Pool stage

5th–8th place classification

Fifth place match

Shooting

Jamaica received two reallocated spots in men's shotgun.

Men

Squash

Jamaica qualified a men's team of three athletes, marking its return to the sport at the Pan American Games for the first time since 2011. As Jamaica's top ranked player Christopher Binnie qualified for the team automatically. The other two qualified after being the top two ranked during a trials.

Men
Singles and Doubles 

Due to an injury sustained five weeks before the games, Christopher Binnie withdrew from the men's singles to focus on the other two events.

Team

Swimming

Jamaica qualified two swimmers (one man and one woman).

Taekwondo

Jamaica received one wildcard in the men's 68 kg event.

Kyorugi
Men

Tennis

Jamaica received one wildcard to enter a male singles competitor.

Men

Wrestling

Jamaica received one wild card in the men's freestyle discipline.

Men's freestyle

Non-competing sports

Karate

Jamaica qualified one female karateka in the kumite discipline, marking the country's scheduled debut in the sport at the Pan American Games. However, Jessica Cargill did not compete or appear in the entry list.

See also
Jamaica at the 2020 Summer Olympics

References

Nations at the 2019 Pan American Games
2019
2019 in Jamaican sport